Lucien Leon Laviscount (born 9 June 1992) is a British actor. He first came to prominence in 2007 after appearing in teen drama Grange Hill. He later appeared in several television series, including ITV's Coronation Street (2009) and BBC One's Waterloo Road (2010–11). In 2011, he competed in the eighth series of Celebrity Big Brother.

In 2015, Laviscount played a regular character, Earl Grey, in the first season of the horror comedy Scream Queens on FOX. In 2017–18, he starred on Sony Crackle’s crime comedy-drama Snatch. Laviscount also starred as Alexander Cabot in The CW series Katy Keene. 

Laviscount reached a worldwide audience in 2021 as recurring cast as Alfie in season 2 of the Netflix series Emily in Paris.

Early life
Laviscount was born in Burnley, Lancashire, and grew up in Read, Ribble Valley in Lancashire. He was born to Eugene Laviscount, a body builder of  Antiguan descent and Sonia Laviscount who is of English descent. He attended Ribblesdale High School in Clitheroe, where he was awarded 10 GCSEs, and was also a member of Carol Godby's theatre workshop in Bury. He has two brothers, Louis and Jules.

Career
At the age of ten, Laviscount appeared in an advertising campaign for Marks & Spencer. He secured roles in programmes such as Clocking Off and Johnny and the Bomb before becoming a series regular in BBC One series Grange Hill. Laviscount was then cast as religious swimmer Ben Richardson in Coronation Street. In 2010, Laviscount took part in a charity football match alongside Jack McMullen, Lyndon Ogbourne and other actors in aid of Sport Relief.

On 18 August 2011, Laviscount became a housemate in Channel 5's Celebrity Big Brother 2011. He lasted until the final week, finishing fifth. He was dubbed 'Mumbles' by his fellow housemates. In 2011, he also appeared as Jonah Kirby, a school pupil, in the TV show Waterloo Road. Laviscount signed with SK Records in 2012, and released his debut single, "Dance With You", featuring American rapper MANN.

On 22 February 2014, it was announced that Laviscount would be playing the lead role of Ennis Ross in Supernatural: Bloodlines, a spin-off to the US CW show Supernatural. He appeared in the backdoor pilot episode but the show did not get picked up. In 2015, Laviscount played a series regular role, Earl Grey, in FOX's US horror comedy series Scream Queens. In 2020 Laviscount appeared as Alexander Cabot in The CW series Katy Keene. 

In 2021 and 2022, Laviscount appeared in the recurring role of Alfie in season two and three of the Netflix series Emily in Paris.

In 2022, Laviscount starred as Jay in BBC 3-part comedy Peacock.

Filmography

Film

Television

Awards and nominations

References

External links

1992 births
Living people
English male soap opera actors
English male child actors
Male actors from Lancashire
Black British male actors
People from Burnley
English people of Antigua and Barbuda descent
English people of Dougla descent